Sondogo is a village in the Niaogho Department of Boulgou Province in south-eastern Burkina Faso. As of 2005, the village has a population of 428.

Geography
Sondogo is located at 9° 59' 10N, 15° 58' 29E. The elevation is 1099 feet above sea level.

References

Populated places in the Centre-Est Region
Boulgou Province